Dr. María Soledad Loaeza Tovar (born April 29, 1950) is a Mexican academic who specializes in the process of democratization and the transformations of society in Mexico.

Biography
Soledad Loaeza completed her high school studies at UNAM's Vidal Castañeda y Najera National "Plantel 4" high school. She received a degree in international relations from the College of Mexico (Colmex), obtaining the title in 1972 with the thesis La política exterior del general Charles de Gaulle, 1962-1970 (which translates to English as "The external politics of General Charles de Gaulle, 1962-1970"). She traveled to Europe to study for an international relations specialization at the Geschwister-Scholl-Institut in Munich and a doctorate summa cum laude in political science at the Institute of Political Studies in Paris with the thesis Classes moyennes, démocratie et nationalisme au Mexique. L'éducation à la recherche du consensus.

Loaeza has taught at the College of Mexico, the Ibero-American University (UIA), the Autonomous Technological Institute of Mexico (ITAM), the Autonomous Metropolitan University Iztapalapa (UAM-I) and at the UNAM School of Political and Social Sciences. She has also taught courses at institutes and universities in the United Kingdom, Spain, the United States, and France. She speaks five languages – Spanish, French, English, German, and Italian.

Since 1987, Loaeza has been a member of the Mexican Academy of Sciences. Since 1990, she has been a member of the International Political Science Association, becoming a member of the Executive Committee from 1991 to 1997. Since 2005, she has been a member of the American Political Science Association. From 2000 to 2006, she was a member of the Political Studies Association. Since 1988, she has been a member of the Latin American Studies Association.

Loaeza is a researcher and professor at the Colmex Center for International Studies. She has been a visiting researcher at the Institute for Political Studies in Paris, the University of Oxford, the Radcliffe Institute for Advanced Study at Harvard University, and the Kellogg Institute at the University of Notre Dame. She is a level III researcher for Mexico's National System of Investigators (Sistema Nacional de Investigadores.)

Awards and distinctions
 Prize for the best article on the history of Mexico from the Mexican Committee of Historical Sciences in 1998
 Research Award in Social Sciences from the Autonomous University of Nuevo León in 2001
 Radcliffe Fellowship from Harvard University in 2003
 Jesús Reyes Heroles Award from the Círculo de Estudios México in 2006
 National Prize for Arts and Sciences in the area of History, Social Sciences, and Philosophy in 2010

Published works
Loaeza has contributed as an editorialist for the newspaper La Jornada, has written more than 30 articles for various magazines, and has written more than 60 chapters for various books published in Mexico, France, the United Kingdom, Argentina, and the United States. She has written prologues and reviews for more than 30 works. She has translated works by Peter H. Smith, Samuel E. Finer, David A. Brading, and Donella H. Meadows. Her published books include:

Clases medias y política en México. La querella escolar 1959-1963, 1968
México: auge, crisis y ajuste, 1982-1988. Los años del cambio, 1992
La cooperación internacional en un mundo desigual, 1994
Oposición y democracia, 1996
Reforma del Estado y democracia en América Latina, 1996
El Partido Acción Nacional: la larga marcha 1939-1994. Oposición leal y partido de protesta, 1999
Del popularismo de los antiguos al populismo de los modernos, 2001
"Siglo XX", Volume V of the Gran Historia Ilustrada de México, 2002
Entre lo posible y lo probable. La experiencia de la transición en México, 2008
Las consecuencias políticas de la expropiación bancaria, 2008
Acción Nacional: el apetito y las responsabilidades del triunfo, 2010

References

External links
 

1950 births
Living people
Writers from Mexico City
20th-century Mexican women writers
21st-century Mexican women writers
20th-century Mexican historians
21st-century Mexican historians
Mexican women historians
Mexican political scientists
Mexican translators
El Colegio de México alumni
Academic staff of El Colegio de México
Academic staff of the National Autonomous University of Mexico
Academic staff of Universidad Iberoamericana
English–Spanish translators
Historians of Mexico
International relations scholars
Members of the Mexican Academy of Sciences
National Prize for Arts and Sciences (Mexico)
Radcliffe fellows
Women political scientists